Parides eurimedes is a species of butterfly in the family Papilionidae. It is commonly known as the mylotes cattleheart, Arcas cattleheart, pink-checked cattleheart, and true cattleheart. It is native to the Americas.

Subspecies
In 2004, Gerardo Lamas combined Parides arcas and Parides timias into Parides eurimedes.  He lists the following subspecies:
 P. e. eurimedes (Stoll, 1782) (northern Colombia and northern Venezuela) 
 P. e. agathokles (Kollar, 1850) (Colombia) 
 P. e. antheas (Rothschild & Jordan, 1906) (Colombia)
 P. e. arriphus (Boisduval, 1836) (central Colombia)
 P. e. emilius Constantino, 1999 (western Colombia)
 P. e. mycale (Godman & Salvin, 1890) (Panama to northern Colombia)
 P. e. mylotes (H.W. Bates, 1861) (southern Mexico to Costa Rica)
 P. e. timias (Gray, [1853]) (western Ecuador)

Description

The wingspan measures . P. e. mylotes is black with both sexes having a red patch on the dorsal hindwing. The dorsal forewing of the male has a triangular green patch. The female has a white patch on the dorsal forewing. A full description (as P. arcas and P.timias) is provided by Rothschild, W. and Jordan, K. (1906)

Distribution and habitat
P. eurimedes is found in the Neotropical realm from Mexico to northern South America, where it is commonly found in tropical forests.

Life cycle
The purple-brown caterpillar is spotted with black. A white lateral stripe is found on each side of the body. The chrysalis is pale yellow green. Host plants include Aristolochia grandiflora, A. nummularfolia, A. odoratissima, A. pilosa, and A. tonduzii.

Taxonomy

Parides eurimedes is a member of the aeneas species group

The members are
Parides aeneas 
Parides aglaope 
Parides burchellanus 
Parides echemon 
Parides eurimedes
Parides lysander – Lysander cattleheart
Parides neophilus – spear-winged cattleheart
Parides orellana 
Parides panthonus – panthonus cattleheart
Parides tros 
Parides zacynthus

References

Further reading

 
 

eurimedes
Butterflies of Central America
Butterflies of North America
Papilionidae of South America
Butterflies described in 1782